Tom "T-Bone" Wolk (December 24, 1951 – February 28, 2010) was an American musician and bassist for the music duo Daryl Hall & John Oates and a member of the Saturday Night Live house band.

Life and career
Wolk was born and raised in Yonkers, New York. He was a state accordion champion by age 12. Seeing the Beatles on Ed Sullivan, however, led him to bass and guitar—the former influenced by James Jamerson and Paul McCartney. He attended Roosevelt High School. Although he studied art at Cooper Union, most of his youth was spent playing in bar bands, where he first met guitarist G.E. Smith (who gave him the nickname T-Bone—for blues guitarist T-Bone Walker—after Wolk played his bass behind his head during a solo).

By the time he auditioned for and joined Hall & Oates in 1981, Wolk had cracked the studio and jingle scene on the recommendation of Will Lee, and had played on rap’s first gold record, Kurtis Blow’s "The Breaks." He played on Hall & Oates hits including "Maneater," "Private Eyes," "I Can’t Go for That (No Can Do)," "Out of Touch," "One on One," and "Family Man." He also anchored the Saturday Night Live house band from 1986–1992 with his Hall & Oates bandmate Smith.

Wolk was a multi-instrumentalist and worked with Daryl Hall, Carly Simon, Jellyfish, Squeeze, Elvis Costello, Shawn Colvin and Billy Joel over the course of his career. Downtime from Hall & Oates led to tours with Carly Simon and Billy Joel, and many studio sessions, highlighted by four albums with Costello and one with Costello and Burt Bacharach.

In 1991, Wolk co-produced Willie Nile's Places I Have Never Been on Columbia Records. Wolk also worked with Ryan Leslie on his self-titled debut album.  Wolk recorded on bluesman Guy Davis' albums, Butt Naked Free and Chocolate to the Bone, and appeared with Guy on Late Night with Conan O'Brien performing, "Waitin' On the Cards to Fall". Wolk had a column in the publication Guitar for the Practicing Musician during the 1980s.

A longtime resident of Brattleboro, Vermont, Wolk maintained a steady recording and touring pace, especially in light of Hall & Oates's re-emergence. He also appeared on the latest albums from Simon (his fifth with her) and ex-New York Yankees baseballer and guitarist Bernie Williams.

Death
Wolk died at age 58 on February 28, 2010, in Pawling, New York from a heart attack. Wolk was survived by his wife, Pam. Will Lee said of Wolk's legacy that "The passing of T-Bone is a huge loss to tasteful, spirited, enthusiastic music-making. His positivity, talents, and gentle production techniques were totally unique. I called him 'Eagle Ears'. I’ll never forget the first playback I heard of his bass playing. I was bowled over by the tone. It was meticulous and methodical, with equal parts crispness and warmth. He went on to do so many great projects as a guitarist, accordionist, producer and more. His legacy lives on."

References

External links
Official website
Daryl Hall and John Oates in memoriam
Elvis Costello in memoriam
Huffington Post in memoriam
Bassplayer magazine obituary
Discography at Discogs
Discography at MusicBrainz

1951 births
2010 deaths
People from Yonkers, New York
Place of birth missing
Hall & Oates members
20th-century American bass guitarists
Saturday Night Live Band members
Billy Joel Band members
Daryl Hall and the Daryl's House Band members